"Never Close Our Eyes" is a song by American singer Adam Lambert from his second studio album, Trespassing. The song was released as the album's second single on April 14, 2012. It was written and produced by Bruno Mars, Philip Lawrence, Ari Levine, Dr. Luke, and Cirkut. The song was met with glowing reviews for the most part, as critics praised it for being a much better offering than previous single "Better Than I Know Myself". The single performed moderately well on the charts. Unlike singles past, "Never Close Our Eyes" is Lambert's first top twenty hit in the United Kingdom, debuting and peaking at number seventeen. The song is also Lambert's second US top ten club hit peaking at number six on the chart.

Background and release 
After the moderate impact that "Better Than I Know Myself" had on the charts, Lambert postponed his second album Trespassing for a May release. Later, on April 11, 2012, Lambert announced that "Never Close Our Eyes" will be the second single and included a photo of the single's artwork. The song premiered the following day through his SoundCloud profile. The song was released on April 16, 2012.

Composition 
"Never Close Our Eyes" was written by Bruno Mars, Philip Lawrence, Ari Levine, Henry Walter, Lukasz Gottwald, all of whom also helmed production for the track, with Gottwald and Walter working under their respective production names Dr. Luke and Cirkut, and Mars, Lawrence, and Levine working in their production team, The Smeezingtons. It is an electropop song, with strong elements of dance-pop and Europop. As noted by Scott Shetler of Pop Crush, the track features a hint of Dr. Luke's up-tempo dance sound while retaining Bruno Mars' melodic pop sensibility.

Lyrically, the carpe diem-themed song is about living life to the fullest and partying until the break of dawn. The song is also about enjoying time with a special someone. In the chorus, Lambert sings: "But you know I wish that this night would never be over/ There's plenty of time to sleep when we die/ So let's just stay awake until we grow older/ If I had my way we'd never close our eyes, our eyes, never!". According to Lambert himself, the song is "about all of US. A community. A movement."

Critical reception
Contessa Gayles of AOL Music Blog called the song an "infectious dance track", while TJ of NeomLimelight called Lambert's vocals "impeccable". Writing for the MTV Buzzworthy blog, Jenna Rubenstein gave the song a positive review, writing: "Set to a pop-rooted dance beat, Adam's rock-tinged pipes carry the entire song as he sings about staying awake 24/7 to enjoy the hell out of his life." Robbie Daw of Idolator wrote that "while the song boasts the slickest pop production since 'Moves Like Jagger', the selling point is, as usual, Adam's angelic rocker vocals, which soar above and loop through the melody with ease." Joe Lynch of Fuse referred to the song as "magnificently theatrical," while writing that "'Never Close Our Eyes' is a satisfying negotiation between an electro-pop banger and romantic anthem. It's the kind of song that's tailored both for the dance floor and at home/in the car sing-alongs."

Jody Rosen of Rolling Stone gave the song three out of five stars, writing, "'Never Close Our Eyes' is that calculated – right down to the lyric, which aims for the same party-at-the-edge-of-doom vibe as recent smashes like 'I Gotta Feeling' and 'Till the World Ends' [...] The magnificence of his strident vocals defies all formulas and precepts, mathematical and otherwise." DJ Ron Slomowicz of About.com praised his voice, writing: "His voice carries a lot of strength, and when he hits the falsetto in 'Never Close Our Eyes', we are once again reminded of how well he handled those upper registers on his debut album." A negative review came from Katharine St. Asaph of Pop Dust, who wrote that "The prechorus, in particular, sounds like nobody could decide whether it called for a dubstep breakdown, spot of synth claps or Travie McCoy interjecting with his acoustic guitar." However she realized that "the problem's not him, it's the material–which is particularly baffling, considering there are at least five better singles on this thing. One of them is right after this."

The song was listed at number ten on Pop Crushs top 10 songs of the year so far.

Music video
The music video was directed by Dori Oskowitz and premiered on May 29, 2012 on Lambert's official Vevo page. It shows Lambert in a monitored futuristic prison where prisoners are manipulated by pills that take away their individuality. Lambert, however, appears to be immune to the pills. When broken, the pills release a blue haze. In the course of the video, Lambert and some of the prisoners retaliate and escape the prison with a neon-soaked dance routine. The video ends with them running through the gates.

Speaking about the video, Lambert said, "The one thing that I was really excited about was maybe something sort of science fiction. Something kind of New World Order, in the future. Something not of this reality. When we put that out there, a gentleman called Dori Oskowitz came back with an amazing treatment. This director is a really cool guy, totally on the same page as me."

Track listing
Digital download
 "Never Close Our Eyes" – 4:08

Remixes
 "Never Close Our Eyes" (Almighty Radio) – 3:57
 "Never Close Our Eyes" (Almighty Club) – 6:34
 "Never Close Our Eyes" (Almighty Dub) – 6:34
 "Never Close Our Eyes" (Digital Dog Radio) – 4:25
 "Never Close Our Eyes" (Digital Dog Club) – 7:41
 "Never Close Our Eyes" (Digital Dog Dub) – 5:34
 "Never Close Our Eyes" (Sunship Radio) – 3:13
 "Never Close Our Eyes" (Sunship Extended) – 4:57
 "Never Close Our Eyes" (Sunship Dub) – 5:12

Charts

Weekly charts

Year-end charts

Radio and release history

References

2012 singles
Adam Lambert songs
Songs written by Dr. Luke
Synth-pop songs
Song recordings produced by Cirkut (record producer)
Song recordings produced by Dr. Luke
Songs written by Bruno Mars
Songs written by Ari Levine
Songs written by Philip Lawrence (songwriter)
Song recordings produced by the Smeezingtons
2012 songs
19 Recordings singles
RCA Records singles